Barge nowadays generally refers to a flat-bottomed inland waterway vessel which does not have its own means of mechanical propulsion. The first modern barges were pulled by tugs, but nowadays most are pushed by pusher boats, or other vessels. The term barge has a rich history, and therefore there are many other types of barges.

History of the barge

Etymology 
"Barge" is attested from 1300, from Old French barge, from Vulgar Latin barga. The word originally could refer to any small boat; the modern meaning arose around 1480. Bark "small ship" is attested from 1420, from Old French barque, from Vulgar Latin barca (400 AD). The more precise meaning of Barque as "three-masted sailing vessel" arose in the 17th century, and often takes the French spelling for disambiguation. Both are probably derived from the Latin barica, from Greek baris "Egyptian boat", from Coptic bari "small boat", hieroglyphic Egyptian D58-G29-M17-M17-D21-P1 and similar ba-y-r for "basket-shaped boat". By extension, the term "embark" literally means to board the kind of boat called a "barque".

The British river barge 

In Great Britain a merchant barge was originally a flat bottomed merchant vessel for use on navigable rivers. Most of these barges had sails. For traffic on the River Severn the barge was described as: The lesser sort are called barges and frigates, being from forty to sixty feet in length, having a single mast and square sail, and carrying from twenty to forty tons burthen. The larger vessels were called trows. On the River Irwell there was reference to barges passing below Barton Aqueduct with their mast and sails standing. Barges on the Thames were called west country barges.

Narrowboats and Widebeams 
During the Industrial Revolution, a substantial network of narrow canals was developed in Great Britain from 1750 onward. It was soon realized that the narrow locks were too limiting. This led to the development of the widebeam.

The narrowboats were initially also known as barges, but only a very few had sails. From the start, most of the new canals were constructed with an adjacent towpath, which made it possible to tow them by draft horses. These types of canal craft are so specific that on the British canal system the term 'barge' is not used to describe narrowboats and widebeams.

The Thames barge and Dutch barge 
On the British canal system, the Thames sailing barge, and Dutch barge and unspecified other styles of barge, are still known as barges. The term Dutch barge is nowadays often used to refer to an accommodation ship, but originally refers to the slightly larger Dutch version of the Thames sailing barge.

Crew and pole 
The people who moved barges were known as lightermen. Poles are used on barges to fend off other nearby vessels or a wharf. These are often called 'pike poles'. The long pole used to maneuver or propel a barge has given rise to the saying "I wouldn't touch that [subject/thing] with a barge pole."

The 19th century British barge 

In the United Kingdom the word barge had many meanings by the 1890s, and these varied locally. On the Mersey a barge was called a 'Flat', on the Thames a Lighter or barge, and on the Humber a 'Keel'. A Lighter had neither mast nor rigging. A keel did have a single mast with sails. Barge and lighter were used indiscriminately. A local distinction was that any flat that was not propelled by steam was a barge, although it might be a sailing flat.

The term Dumb barge was probably taken into use to end the confusion. The term Dumb barge surfaced in the early nineteenth century. It first denoted the use of a barge as a mooring platform in a fixed place. As it went up and down with the tides, it made a very convenient mooring place for steam vessels. Within a few decades, the term dumb barge evolved, and came to mean: 'a vessel propelled by oars only'. By the 1890s Dumb barge was still used only on the Thames.

By 1880 barges on British rivers and canals were often towed by steam tugboats. On the Thames, many dumb barges still relied on their poles, oars and the tide. Others dumb barges made use of about 50 tugboats to tow them to their destinations. While many coal barges were towed, many dumb barges that handled single parcels were not.

The 19th century American barge 
In the United States a barge was not a sailing vessel by the end of the 19th century. Indeed, barges were often created by cutting down razeeing sailing vessels. In New York this was an accepted meaning of the term barge. The somewhat smaller scow was built as such, but the scow also had its sailing counterpart the sailing scow.

The modern barge

The iron barge 
The innovation that led to the modern barge was the use of iron barges towed by a steam tugboat. These were first used to transport grain and other bulk products. From about 1840 to 1870 the towed iron barge was quickly introduced on the Rhine, Danube, Don, Dniester, and rivers in Egypt, India and Australia. Many of these barges were built in Great Britain.

Nowadays 'barge' generally refers to a dumb barge. In Europe, a Dumb barge is: An inland waterway transport freight vessel designed to be towed which does not have its own means of mechanical propulsion. In America, a barge is generally pushed.

Modern use 

Barges are used today for low-value bulk items, as the cost of hauling goods by barge is very low.

As an example, on June 26, 2006, a  catalytic cracking unit reactor was shipped by barge from the Tulsa Port of Catoosa in Oklahoma to a refinery in Pascagoula, Mississippi. Extremely large objects are normally shipped in sections and assembled onsite, but shipping an assembled unit reduced costs and avoided reliance on construction labor at the delivery site (which in this case was still recovering from Hurricane Katrina).

Self-propelled barges may be used as such when traveling downstream or upstream in placid waters; they are operated as an unpowered barge, with the assistance of a tugboat, when traveling upstream in faster waters. Canal barges are usually made for the particular canal in which they will operate.

Barges in the United States 

In times before industrial development, railways, and highways: barges were the predominant and most efficient means of inland transportation in many regions. This holds true today, for many areas of the world.

In such pre-industrialized, or poorly developed infrastructure regions, many barges are purpose-designed to be powered on waterways by long slender poles – thereby becoming known on American waterways as poleboats as the extensive west of North America was settled using the vast tributary river systems of the Mississippi drainage basin. Poleboats use muscle power of "walkers" along the sides of the craft pushing a pole against the streambed, canal or lake bottom to move the vessel where desired. In settling the American west it was generally faster to navigate downriver from Brownsville, Pennsylvania, to the Ohio River confluence with the Mississippi and then pole upriver against the current to St. Louis than to travel overland on the rare primitive dirt roads for many decades after the American Revolution.

Once the New York Central and Pennsylvania Railroads reached Chicago, that time dynamic changed, and American poleboats became less common, relegated to smaller rivers and more remote streams. On the Mississippi riverine system today, including that of other sheltered waterways, industrial barge trafficking in bulk raw materials such as coal, coke, timber, iron ore and other minerals is extremely common; in the developed world using huge cargo barges that connect in groups and trains-of-barges in ways that allow cargo volumes and weights considerably greater than those used by pioneers of modern barge systems and methods in the Victorian era.

Such barges need to be towed by tugboats or pushed by towboats. Canal barges, towed by draft animals on a waterway adjacent towpath were of fundamental importance in the early Industrial Revolution, whose major early engineering projects were efforts to build viaducts, aqueducts and especially canals to fuel and feed raw materials to nascent factories in the early industrial takeoff (18th century) and take their goods to ports and cities for distribution.

The barge and canal system contended favourably with the railways in the early Industrial Revolution before around the 1850s–1860s; for example, the Erie Canal in New York state is credited by economic historians with giving the growth boost needed for New York City to eclipse Philadelphia as America's largest port and city – but such canal systems with their locks, need for maintenance and dredging, pumps and sanitary issues were eventually outcompeted in the carriage of high-value items by the railways due to the higher speed, falling costs and route flexibility of rail transport. Barge and canal systems were nonetheless of great, perhaps even primary, economic importance until after the First World War in Europe, particularly in the more developed nations of the Low Countries, France, Germany and especially Great Britain which more or less made the system characteristically its own.

Nowadays, custom built special purpose equipment called modular barges are extensively used in surveying, mapping, laying and burial of subsea optic fibre cables worldwide and other support services.

In the United States, deckhands perform the labor and are supervised by a bos'n or the mate. The captain and pilot steer the towboat, which pushes one or more barges held together with rigging, collectively called 'the tow'. The crew live aboard the towboat as it travels along the inland river system or the intracoastal waterways. These towboats travel between ports and are also called line-haul boats.

Types

 Admiral's barge
 Articulated tug and barge
 Barracks barge ("accommodation barge")
 Bin barge
 Canal motorship
 Car float
 Ferrocement or "Concrete" Barge
 Crane barge
 Dredges
 Deck barge
 Dutch barge
 Dry bulk cargo barge
Gundalow
 Hopper barge
 Hotel barge
 Horse-drawn boat
 Jackup barge
 Landing craft
 Lighter
 Liquid cargo barge
 Log barge
 Notch barge
 Narrowboat
 Norfolk wherry
 Rocket landing barge
 Oil barge
 Paddle barge
 Péniche or Spitz barge
 Pleasure barge
 Power barge
 Row barge
 Royal barge
 Sand barge
 Severn trow
 Tank barge
 Thames sailing barge
 Tub boat
 Vehicular barge
 Whaleback barge
 Widebeam

Image gallery

See also

 American Waterways Operators
 Burlak
 Canal boat Ross Barlow
 Car float
 Chain boat
 Container on barge
 Dory
 Float (nautical)
 Hughes Mining Barge
 Lighter
 Mobro 4000
 Pusher (boat)
 Shallop
 Tub boat
 Type B ship

References

Notes

External links

 Barge Lehigh Valley 79 at the Waterfront Museum, Brooklyn, New York, United States
 Britain's Official guide to canals, rivers and lakes
 
 Crane Barge 89 Ton Design 264B
 DBA The Barge Association
 The American Waterways Operators

 
Shipping